Peter Zizka (born 16 December 1961) is a German designer and conceptual artist.

Life 

Zizka is the younger son of the social politician Walburga Zizka (Christian Democratic Union of Germany) and Cyril Zizka, of Czech descendant. Initially trained as an art restorer, Peter Zizka went to study graphics, design, and visual communication at the Hochschule für Gestaltung Offenbach in 1983. At the same time, he attended the Städelschule in Frankfurt and studied under Bruce McLean, among others.

In 1989, together with Achim Heine and Michael Lenz, Zizka founded the design company Heine/Lenz/Zizka.

Parallel, in the early 1990s, Zizka and Olaf Rahlwes explored the interface between art and design with their MEMORY conceptual art exhibitions.

After leaving MEMORY, Zizka worked on design projects that were socially relevant. In his work, Zizka adopts a less agitative position than that of a communication guerrilla or an adbuster such as Banksy. The most well known of his work from this series is The Virtual Minefield,  the first floor-based installation spanning art and design. Zizka won the gold award from the European Art Directors Club for The Virtual Minefield. It was shown at the Kunsthal Rotterdam, the Foreign Office in Berlin and the Hygiene Museum Dresden among others.

In 2008, Zizka won the design competition for the Kiel Week corporate design, following the likes of Wim Crouwel (1998), Fons Hickmann (2002), and Klaus Hesse (2006).

2010 he starts an art Project in Burundi to render weapons of the Hutu Tutsi conflict harmless in real terms and at the same time initiate a process, by means of aesthetisation, which is relevant to society to open up a discussion on the issue of small arms tangible on a broad communication level.

2011 he received the fellowship of the Deutsche Akademie Rom Villa Massimo.

Zizka writes about design for the Swiss Bilanz magazine and is a freelance curator for the Museum für angewandte Kunst Frankfurt.

Peter Zizka works and lives in  Frankfurt am Main und Berlin. His brother, Georg Zizka, is the Head of Botany and Molecular Evolution of the Senckenberg Institute in Frankfurt.

Curated exhibitions 

2016

 »Stefan Sagmeister: The Happy Show«, Museum für angewandte Kunst Frankfurt, Frankfurt. This exhibition was originally organized by the Institute of Contemporary Art, Philadelphia and curated by Claudia Gould.
 »New Everything! A Century of New Typography and New Graphic Design in Frankfurt am Main«, together with Prof. Dr. Klaus Klemp, Prof. em. Friedrich Friedl and Matthias Wagner K, Museum für angewandte Kunst Frankfurt, Frankfurt.

Selected solo and group exhibitions 

2016
 »Under Arms. Fire & Forget 2«, curated by Ellen Blumstein, Dr. Daniel Tyradellis und Matthias Wagner K, Museum für angewandte Kunst Frankfurt, Frankfurt

2015

 »Secret Compartments«, Museum für angewandte Kunst Frankfurt, Frankfurt 
 »Favourites. Favourite pieces from the private collections of Beckers and Landau«, Galerie Braubachstrasse9, Frankfurt

2013

 »Symbiosis - 1,5 Tonnen globale Verwicklung«, Kunsthalle E-werk, Freiburg
 »For a mine-free world«, United Nations, Main Gallery, New York
 »Open View«, Nassauischer Kunstverein, Wiesbaden

2012

 »Night of the Villa Massimo«, Martin-Gropius-Bau, Berlin
 »Abwehr. Überlebensstrategien in Natur, Wirtschaft, Politik und Alltag«, Stiftung Charles und Agnes Vögele, Zürich-Pfäffikon

2011

 »Symbiosis – 1.5 Tons of Global Entanglement«, ZKM Center for Art and Media Karlsruhe, Karlsruhe
 »Festa del‘ estate«, German Academy Rome Villa Massimo, Rome

2009

 »War and Medicine«, German Hygiene Museum, Dresden

2005

 »De soldaat die nooit slaapt«, Kunsthal, Rotterdam
 »The virtual Minefield«, Stadthalle (Freiburg im Breisgau), Freiburg
 »The virtual Minefield«, Schauspiel Frankfurt, Frankfurt 
 Lew Kopelew Forum, Cologne

2004

 »The virtual Minefield«, Auswärtiges Amt, Lichthof, Berlin

1997

 »Memory« with Olaf Rahlwes, Kunst Halle St. Gallen, St. Gallen

Further exhibitions of the »Memory«-Group from 1985-1994 include Fisherman’s Studios, London, Kunstraum Konstantin Adamopulos, Frankfurt, Galerie AK, Hans Sworowski, Frankfurt, Galerie Lukas & Hoffmann, Berlin, Galerie Single 74, Amsterdam, Galerie Vorsetzen, Hamburg und Galerie Schneider, Konstanz.

Works 
 MEMORY 1-24
 Der Frankfurter Bankstuhlgang (performance)
 Bois de Boulogne (fotoinstallation)
 The Virtual Minefield (installation)
 IPRAY (2006)
 Outliner (2008, installation)
 Symbiosis/Burundi (2010/11, installation) constructed from weapons which have been rendered unusable

Bibliography 

 Memory 30 – a book, Walther König: Frankfurt
 ROGUE, Konstantin Adamopoulos: MEMORY, a sign of intelligence
 Page Designmagazin 10/95 a perfect triangle, Page Verlag
 FrancoForte, Verlag: Schaden u. Schaden 
 Horizont 18/2002 colors of taste
 Horizont 23/2002 Das Werkzeug als Auge sensibler Stars
 Welt am Sonntag, 24. November 2002 Objektive Schönheit
 TAZ, 2. Dezember 2004 Der falsche Tritt kann tödlich sein
 Gestalte / Create – Design Medien Kunst, Hrsg. v. Bernd Kracke 2007,HFG of–main, Wir die Kommunikationannimateure 
 Hundert t-Variationen, editor Jan Teunen, Verlag Hermann Schmidt Mainz, 
 form 213, Hasta la Vista Baby!, Verlag Form 
 Padamm, Verlag otto Lembeck, die Zweiweltenoper, 
 Design Walk, Psyrri, Greek Graphic Designers Association
 Page Designmagzine 06/07 Wertvolles Dazwischen, Page Verlag
 Form 219/2008 "Peter Zizkas Graphic blows" 
 Beef 03/2008 (interview) Designer geben den Takt vor ISSN 1866-1890
 Lookbook 2.0 2009 Simple, Multiple
 Designing the Brand Experience, 
 Revision 1/2009 "Design-lotto easy going"
 Egokollektiv. Peter Zizka«, edited by Anna Duque y González and Matthias Wagner K, Verlag der Buchhandlung Walther König, Köln 2018, .

References

External links 
 Kunsthal Rotterdam
 medico international anti landmine campaign
 Workshop Vitra Design Museum
 Interview of Deutschen Designer Clubs with P.Zizka 
 talk with Stefan Sagmeister at the KISD
 Projectpage of Symbiosis/Burundi

German conceptual artists
German graphic designers
German poster artists
Städelschule alumni
Living people
1961 births